Penelope Nice is a British comedy actress.

Filmography
Doctors - Sarah Shapiro (1 episode, 2000)
Mr. Bean (1 episode, 1995)
Bodger and Badger (1 episode, 1995)
Drop the Dead Donkey - Nurse (1 episode, 1991)
The Bill - Mrs. Potter (1 episode, 1991)
Press Gang - Mrs. Day  (6 episodes, 1989–1990)
The Franchise Affair (1988) (TV) - Mrs. Wynn
Casualty - Mrs. Lippman (1 episode, 1987)
She'll Be Wearing Pink Pyjamas (1985) - Ann
Tales of the Unexpected - Julie Forester (1 episode, 1983)
BBC2 Playhouse - Tina (1 episode, 1982)
Room Service (1979) TV series - Marlene Barry (unknown episodes)
Within These Walls - Carol Standstead / ... (2 episodes, 1976–1978)

Radio
Revolting People - Cora Oliphant (2001-2004)
Old Harry's Game - Penelope Whittingham/Gracie Fields (4 episodes)
Molesworth - 1987 - Mrs. Molesworth

External links

British actresses
Living people
Year of birth missing (living people)